Austrogastrura is a genus of springtails in the family Hypogastruridae. There are at least three described species in Austrogastrura.

Species
These three species belong to the genus Austrogastrura:
 Austrogastrura lobata (Yosii, 1959) i c g
 Austrogastrura marambaia g
 Austrogastrura travassosi (Arlè, 1939) i c g
Data sources: i = ITIS, c = Catalogue of Life, g = GBIF, b = Bugguide.net

References

Further reading

 
 
 

Collembola
Springtail genera